Jon Birkfeldt (born 3 June 1996) is a Swedish football defender who plays for Varbergs BoIS.

References

1996 births
Living people
Swedish footballers
Association football defenders
Åtvidabergs FF players
IFK Värnamo players
IK Frej players
Varbergs BoIS players
Superettan players
Allsvenskan players